io9 is part of Gizmodo media since 2015, and it began as blog launched in 2008 by Gawker Media. The site initially focused on the subjects of science fiction, fantasy, futurism, science, technology and related areas but over the years has shifted to more of a focus on science-fiction/fantasy-based pop-culture including movies, television, video games, comic books, and related toys. It was founded by Annalee Newitz, a former policy analyst for the Electronic Frontier Foundation and contributor to Popular Science, Wired, and New Scientist. Other contributors included co-founding editors Charlie Jane Anders and Kevin Kelly, in addition to Geoff Manaugh (BLDGBLOG), Graeme McMillan (Newsarama), Meredith Woerner, Alasdair Wilkins, Cyriaque Lamar, Tim Barribeau, Esther Inglis-Arkell, Lauren Davis, Robbie Gonzalez, Keith Veronese, George Dvorsky, and Lynn Peril. Between October 2010 and January 2012 io9 hosted the Geek's Guide to the Galaxy podcast, produced by John Joseph Adams and David Barr Kirtley.

In 2015 io9 became a part of Gizmodo, as part of a reorganization under parent company Gawker.

History

Annalee Newitz (2008–2015)
In 2008, shortly after Newitz's project, other magazine, ceased print publication, Gawker media asked them to start a science and sci-fi blog. In an interview, Newitz explained the significance of the name "io9": "Well, io9s are input-output devices that let you see into the future. They're brain implants that were outlawed because they drove anyone who used one insane. We totally made that (device) up to name the blog. The blog is about looking into the future and science fiction, so we wanted to come up with a fictional name, something that was science fiction." io9'''s "Explanations" page gives further details on the fictional backstory of these devices.

The blog is indexed by Google News. In February 2010, it was named one of the top 30 science blogs by Michael Moran of The Times Eureka Zone blog, who wrote, "Ostensibly a blog for science fiction enthusiasts, io9 finds space for pieces on cutting-edge technology, the wilder fringes of astronomy and the more worrying implications of grey goo."

In 2012, io9 created a video series called "io9: We Come From The Future". It had 32 shows from April 13, 2012 through November 16, 2012. It was hosted by Annalee Newitz and Esther Inglis-Arkell. It was shown on the Internet television network Revision3 and on YouTube. The show discussed the latest news in science and science fiction.io9 was referenced in the American television series Dollhouse.

Charlie Jane Anders (2015–2016) — Gizmodo merger
After seven years as head editor, in January 2014 Newitz became the new editor at Gizmodo, while co-founder Anders remained as editor at io9, as part of a plan by Gawker to integrate io9 with Gizmodo. io9's 11 member staff joined Gizmodo's 22 person staff, under Newitz's overall supervision. One of the reasons for the merger was to better coordinate content: io9 is a science and science fiction blog, while Gizmodo is a technology blog, which resulted in what Gawker assessed as roughly a 12% rate of overlapping content.

Newitz remained as a contributor at io9 in 2014, however they later stated that they grew to dislike managing both sites at once, because it took so much time away from their main passion of writing articles. Therefore, after a nearly eight-year run, Newitz retired from both io9 and Gizmodo on November 30, 2015, to take a position as tech culture editor at Ars Technica. Anders remained as head editor of io9.

The resulting combined news site technically uses the domain name "io9.gizmodo.com", though in practice io9 and Gizmodo are still separate subsections, using their old logos on their own specific content. The old "io9.com" URL automatically links to the main io9 subpage of "io9.gizmodo.com".

Besides Newitz, several other longtime core staff members left their positions at io9 during this transitional time period in 2015. Meredith Woerner departed io9 in May 2015, to write for the Los Angeles Times "Hero Complex" column. Lauren Davis and Robbie Gonzalez left in August 2015: Davis went back to school to complete her MFA, and Gonzalez left for a position at Wired. By May 2016 none of the original 2008 contributors were left on the site and neither were any of the staff in the 2010–2012 era. Before Newitz's departure, however, many new contributors were added to io9, including Rob Bricken, Cheryl Eddy, George Dvorsky, Andrew Liptak, Germain Lussier, Ria Misra, James Whitbrook, and Katharine Trendacosta.

Rob Bricken (2016–2018)
On 26 April 2016 Charlie Jane Anders confirmed that she was leaving the site to focus her attention on her then untitled second novel and that Rob Bricken would take over as editor.

Jill Pantozzi (2018–2021)

On July 31, 2018, Rob Bricken announced that he was stepping down as editor of io9, saying that managing the site was taking up too much time and he would rather spend writing articles for it. He announced that his place as editor would be filled by Jill Pantozzi, former editor-in-chief of The Mary Sue, who had originally joined io9 as a managing editor and took up the deputy editor position after Bricken's departure.

Pantozzi later left the site entirely in December 2021.

James Whitbrook (2021–present)

James Whitbrook, who had been an io9 staff writer since 2014, was promoted to news editor in July 2019. Following the departure of Pantozzi it was announced that Whitbrook had been made the new Deputy Editor in charge of io9.''

References

External links

American blogs
Former Univision Communications subsidiaries
Gawker Media
Internet properties established in 2008
Science fiction organizations